Alexander Forrester ( 1711 – 2 July 1787) was a British barrister and politician.

Forrester's family were Scottish Jacobites who had gone into exile in France with King James II, but little is known of his parents.

Forrester was educated at the Inner Temple, and became a successful barrister.  After 1758, he specialised in cases before the House of Lords, including election petitions

He was a Member of Parliament for Dunwich from 1658 to 1761, for Okehampton from 1761 to 1768, and for Newcastle-under-Lyme from 1768 to 1774.

References 
 

1711 births
1787 deaths
Members of the Inner Temple
Members of the Parliament of Great Britain for Newcastle-under-Lyme
British MPs 1754–1761
British MPs 1761–1768
British MPs 1768–1774
Year of birth uncertain
Members of the Parliament of Great Britain for Okehampton